Ryan McDonough may refer to:
Ryan McDonough (ice hockey) (born 1988), Canadian ice hockey player
Ryan McDonough (NBA executive), NBA executive